Echinogurges tuberculatus is a species of sea snail, a marine gastropod mollusk in the family Eucyclidae.

Description
The shell grows to a height of 4.6 mm.

Distribution
This species occurs in the Caribbean Sea off Cuba and Yucatan; in the Atlantic Ocean off Georgia, the Bahamas and the Florida Strait.

References

 Quinn, J. F., Jr. 1991. New species of Gaza, Mirachelus, Calliotropis, and Echinogurges (Gastropoda: Trochidae) from the northwestern Atlantic Ocean. Nautilus 105: 166–172

External links

tuberculatus
Gastropods described in 1991